Tyrawa may refer to the following places in Poland:

Tyrawa Solna
Tyrawa Wołoska